The Free University of Bozen-Bolzano (Italian: Libera Università di Bolzano, German: Freie Universität Bozen, Ladin: Università Liedia de Bulsan) is a university primarily located in Bolzano, South Tyrol, Italy. It was founded on 31 October 1997 and is organized into five Faculties.

Campus 
The university has three campuses: at Bolzano, Brixen and Bruneck. The buildings in Bolzano were designed by the architects Matthias Bischoff and Roberto Azzola of Zürich and those at Brixen by Regina Kohlmeyer and Jens Oberst from Stuttgart. The latter won in 2005 the 9th architecture prize of the city of Oderzo.

Rectors
The rectors of the university were previously Alfred Steinherr, an economist from Luxembourg, from 1998 to 2003, the Swiss linguist Rita Franceschini, from 2004 to 2008, and the German sociologist Walter Lorenz, from 2008 to 2016. The Italian engineer Paolo Lugli is the actual rector since 2017.

Faculty of Economics and Management

The Faculty of Economics and Management is based at Bolzano and Bruneck. It offers three bachelor's and three master's degree programs.
Bachelor in Economics and Management
Bachelor in Economics and Social Sciences PPE (Philosophy, Politics and Economics)
Bachelor in Tourism, Sport and Event Management (in Bruneck)
Master in Entrepreneurship and Innovation
Master in Economics and Management of the Public Sector
Master in Accounting and Finance
PhD in Management and Economics 

The research clusters of the faculty are:
 Tourism, Marketing and Regional Development
 Law, Economics and Institutions
 Financial Markets and Regulations
 Entrepreneurship and Innovation
 Quantitative Methods and Economic Modelling

Faculty of Education
The Faculty of Education is in Brixen and the following courses are active:
Bachelor in Social Work
Bachelor for Social Education
Bachelor in Communication Sciences and Culture
Master in Primary Education (5 years)
Master in Innovation and Research for Social Work and Social Education (IRIS)
Master in Musicology
PhD in General Pedagogy, Social Pedagogy and General Education

Main research areas at the faculty are:

 Educational and development projects and processes for different age groups and contexts
 Social dynamics, social cohesion, citizenship and solidarity systems
 Languages and communication for a multicultural and multilingual society

Faculty of Computer Science
The Faculty of Computer Science is based in Bolzano and has the following courses:
Bachelor in Computer Science
Bachelor in Informatics and Management of Digital Business
Master in Software Engineering for Information Systems
Master in Computational Data Science
PhD in Computer Science

The faculty's research centres are:

 Research Centre for Information and Database Systems Engineering (IDSE)
 Research Centre for Knowledge and Data (KRDB)
 Research Centre for Software and Systems Engineering (SwSE)

Faculty of Science and Technology
The Faculty of Science and Technology has the following active courses:
Bachelor in Agricultural and Agro-Environmental Sciences
Bachelor in Industrial and Mechanical Engineering
Bachelor in Wood Engineering 
Master in Industrial Mechanical Engineering
Master in Energy Engineering
Master in Environmental Management of Mountain Areas
International Master in Horticulture Science
Master in Viticulture, Enology and Wine Marketing
PhD in Mountain Environment and Agriculture
PhD in Sustainable Energy and Technologies
Food Engineering and Biotechnology

The main research areas of the faculty are:

 Agricultural Sciences
 Energy Resources and Energy Efficiency
 Food Sciences
 Fundamental Sciences for Innovative Applications
 Management and Technologies for Mountain Environments
 Industrial Engineering and Automation

Faculty of Design and Art
The Faculty of Design and Art offers the following courses:
Bachelor in Design and Art - Major in Design
Bachelor in Design and Art - Major in Art
Master in Eco-Social Design
1st Level Master in Design for Children

The main research areas of the faculty are:
 Visual culture and its impact on society
 Phenomena, processes and results of three-dimensional projects
 Theories, forms and languages of design, art and visual culture

The faculty also operates a fab lab named Bitz, which is also open to users not affiliated with unibz.

European Master Programmes
The Faculty of Computer Science at the Free University of Bozen-Bolzano is very active in this way and is amongst the research centers recognized by the European Union as a leader in this program. There are two European Master Programmes in the area of computer science running in this university, under Erasmus Mundus Programme:
European Master Program in Computational Logic
European Master on Software Engineering

Studium Generale 
Since 2011, there has been a multidisciplinary Studium Generale course, which offers a wide range of lectures in fields of general interest.

Research

A total of 917 projects of basic and applied research have been conducted within the university since 1998.

The university has scientific and technological laboratories at each of its sites, at the NOI Techpark, a local technological and innovation hub, and at the Versuchszentrum Laimburg, an agronomy research institute.

Library
According to library ranking system issued by German library networks (BIX project) in 2009, this university has the second best library amongst German-speaking states (Germany, Switzerland, Austria and South Tyrol in Italy).

Students activities
The members of the student advisory board are elected every two years, however, between two elections a petition for the representative could be announced. Student representative are members of the University Council, the Academic Senate, the Faculty Council, the Course Council, the Equal Opportunities Committee and the Didactic Joint Committee. 
The South Tyrolean Student association is the most important South Tyrolean association for students. Beside the head office in Bolzano there are seven branch offices in Austria and Italy. The sh.asus was founded in 1955 as a non-profit association. It represents South Tyrolean students studying abroad and students in South Tyrol.
The M.U.A., Movimento Universitario Altoatesino, is an association which has been recognize by the Autonomous Province of Bozen-Bolzano and has been founded in the 1993. Its principal purposes are "to defend and ease the right to study of the students and the working students of the university" and "to organize conferences, debatings, conventions, cultural, social and university seminar". The association operates in Bolzano and promotes the project WEBZ, "the first web-tv of South-Tyrol made by youngs for youngs."
Kikero is a cultural association, which has been founded in 2000 and organizes activities such as the debating club and the movie nights. Furthermore, Kikero is also responsible for the university magazine "Kflyer".
SCUB, Sports Club University Bozen-Bolzano, is the students' association that mainly deals with sports activities and that organizes every year the SNOWDAYS, Europe's biggest wintersport event for students from all over Italy and the EU. SCUB comprises also the UniParty team, which is in charge of throwing university parties for unibz students.
A further student association is the Bozen – Bolzano local committee AIESEC, which organizes international exchange programmes to permit university students to get in touch with the working world.
PRO – Students for Business also encourages students to connect with the working environment through the enhancement of economic and business activities.
The university also has a choir called UnibzVoices, conducted by Prof. Johann Van der Sandt who teaches "Music and Communication" at the Brixen College of Education.
The most recent student association is the Alumni Club that comprises graduates of the Free University of Bozen–Bolzano.

Bibliography
 Hans Karl Peterlini & Hannes Obermair (eds), Universitas Est. Essays and documents on the history of education in Tyrol/South-Tyrol, 2 Vol. (Bozen-Bolzano University Press, Raetia Verlag, Bozen/Bolzano 2008), 
 Klaus Kempf, Franz Berger, The Library as a Service Point. The Case of the Bozen University Library: Planning, Building, Financing, in "Liber Quarterly", 10, 2000, pp. 108–116. (Download PDF 52 KB)
 Universitätsreden an der Freien Universität Bozen / Discorsi d'ateneo alla Libera Università di Bolzano / Public Talks at the Free University of Bozen, 6 voll., Bolzano, Bozen-Bolzano University Press, 2005-ss. ISBN (ISSN) 2494716-7
List of universities in Italy

See also 
 Library of the Free University of Bozen-Bolzano

References

External links
The official website of the unibz
The faculty of design's student blog
The library of the Free University of Bozen-Bolzano
Pagina dello Sports Club Universitario 

Free University of Bozen-Bolzano
Bolzano
Educational institutions established in 1997
Education in South Tyrol
1997 establishments in Italy